is a Japanese actor and dancer who is known for his portrayal of Sougo Tokiwa in Kamen Rider Zi-O and Hayato Shinomiya in Kiss Him, Not Me. He is a member of Oscar Promotion's acting troupe Aoyama Omotesando X.

Biography
Okuno won the 30th Junon Superboy Contest with over 17,000 applicants in 2017. In 2018 he was cast to play Sougo Tokiwa in Kamen Rider Zi-O. According to producer Shinichiro Shirakura, it was particularly difficult to cast a young man who could properly portray Sougo's kingly aura. He said that Okuno was eventually chosen due to his unique outlook on the world, and considered it an act of fate. Okuno dropped out of high school when he was cast as Sougo Tokiwa. He trained in classical ballet for over 11 years and has incorporated some of it into his transformation pose and Zi-O's fighting skills.

Okuno says that he is very optimistic about life like Sougo, but doesn't have the skills to communicate with "everyone".

Okuno's hobbies include reading manga and playing video games. His favorite Rider is Kamen Rider Kiva.

Filmography

TV dramas

Films

See also
List of Japanese actors

References

External links
Official Instagram

Male actors from Osaka Prefecture
2000 births
Living people
Japanese male television actors
Japanese male dancers
People from Neyagawa, Osaka